Carol Jane Sealey (born 18 April 1959) is a Canadian basketball player. She competed in the women's tournament at the 1984 Summer Olympics.

Sealey has three children. After retiring from competitions she had a long career as a high school basketball coach in the United States.

References

External links
 

1959 births
Living people
Canadian women's basketball players
American women's basketball coaches
Olympic basketball players of Canada
Basketball players at the 1984 Summer Olympics
Basketball players from Montreal